The Action is Go is the fourth studio album by American stoner rock band Fu Manchu. It features new drummer Brant Bjork (Kyuss) and new lead guitarist Bob Balch, replacing Eddie Glass and Ruben Romano, who left to form the band Nebula. The album was produced by Jay Noel Yuenger of White Zombie, who contributed some additional instrumentation.

According to an AllMusic review, the new lineup provided Fu Manchu with "the impetus and inspiration to really start moving forward," and the resulting album demonstrates the band's "punk energy, classic rock drive, psychedelic crunch, and heavy-ass grind all at once."

Track listing 

The European version includes two more songs:

Personnel 
Scott Hill – vocals, guitar
Brant Bjork – drums
Bob Balch – guitar
Brad Davis – bass, theremin
Jay Noel Yuenger – producer, organ, Minimoog, Electro-Harmonix Space Drum

Notes
"Module Overload" was first released on the Godzilla EP and was re-recorded with a new vocal line and a different middle part. The original version appears again on Eatin' Dust.
"Swami's Last Command" was originally a contribution to the soundtrack of the movie Chicago Cab (1998).
"Evil Eye" was featured on Tony Hawk's Pro Skater 2.
Tony Alva (of Z-Boys) is on the CD cover skating in the "Dogbowl".
This albums introduces Brad Davis on the theremin which he used again on Start the Machine.

References

1997 albums
Fu Manchu (band) albums
Mammoth Records albums
Albums recorded at Sound City Studios